The Calchaquí Wars were a series of military conflicts between the Diaguita Confederation and the Spanish Empire in the 1560–1667 period. The wars raged in the Argentine Northwest, in what are now the provinces of Jujuy, Salta, Tucumán, Catamarca and La Rioja.

First War
In 1559, the gobernador Juan Pérez de Zurita founded the city of Córdoba de Calchaquí; he then expected local tribes to submit to the encomienda system of servitude, but these tribes resisted this attempt. Spanish Captain Julián Cedeño captured a curaca known as Chumbicha, and Zurita used him to negotiate with his brother who was the curaca del of the town of Tolombón. This last curaca accepted baptism as part of the negotiations, becoming then known under the Christian name of Juan Calchaquí.

However, once Juan Calchaquí understood the unequal nature of the encomienda he rebelled and led attacks against the Spanish, evicting them of the three cities founded by Zurita: Córdoba de Calchaquí, Londres in present-day Catamarca Province and  Cañete. After the Omaguacas also revolted and destroyed ciudad de Nieva, now known as San Salvador de Jujuy, the whole Spanish population of Tucumán was forced to concentrate in its, Santiago del Estero. This was a serious setback for the Spanish conquistadors and in historiography favourable to Spain the war has been labelled "one of the worst tragedies of our history".

References

Diaguita
Governorate of the Río de la Plata
Indigenous rebellions against the Spanish Empire
Spanish conquests in the Americas
16th century in the Captaincy General of Chile
17th century in the Captaincy General of Chile
Wars involving Argentina
Wars involving Chile
Wars involving Spain
Viceroyalty of Peru